Ruth Wakefield Cravath (1902–1986) was an American stonework artist and arts educator, specifically known for her public sculptures, busts and bas-reliefs in the San Francisco Bay Area.

Biography 
Ruth Barrows Cravath was born in Chicago, Illinois on January 23, 1902 to Ruth Myra Rew and James Raney Cravath.

In high school Cravath attended summer art classes at the Art Institute of Chicago. Cravath attended college at Grinnell College in Iowa for one year before moving to California in 1921 to join her family. She attended California School of Fine Arts in San Francisco and studied with Beniamino Bufano and Ralph Stackpole. She learned "cut direct" sculpting techniques from Stackpole. In 1926 she started teaching at the California School of Fine Arts, where some of her students being artists, Jacques Schnier and Raymond Puccinelli. In the same year, she co-founded the San Francisco Summer Art School for Children with Marian Trace. In 1928 she married Sam Bell Wakefield III.

Cravath was commissioned to create three statues for the north court of the 1940 Golden Gate International Exposition, GGIE, designed by Timothy L. Pflueger. Her three statues surrounded the "Fountain of Western Waters" in the  "Court of Pacifica" area of the Exposition and included a large sculpture named "Alaskan boy spearing a fish".

Her brother Austin Cravath married the artist Dorothy Wagner Puccinelli in 1941. In 1945, Cravath began teaching art at Mills College in Oakland. From 1958 to 1986, she lived at the historic Kerrigan House at 893 Wisconsin Street, between 22nd Street and Madera Street in San Francisco.

Cravath died on November 30, 1986 in Poulsbo, Washington at the age of 84.

Public works 
Cravath's best known work in the San Francisco Bay Area was her 27-foot-tall, cast-concrete and steel-reinforced statue of St. Francis that stood at the entrance of Candlestick Park from 1973 until 2015.

San Francisco Bay Area 
 1929, Fountain in Tennessee Marble, Emanu-El Sisterhood Residency (now called San Francisco Zen Center, the fountain has been removed), San Francisco
 1930, Bar Maid, The Pacific Stock Exchange Lunch Club (now called The City Club), San Francisco
 1930, Laborers, The Pacific Stock Exchange Lunch Club (now called The City Club), San Francisco
 Athletic Award Tablet, Tamalpais School (now called Marin Academy), San Rafael
 William Award (bronze tablet), Tamalpais School (now called Marin Academy), San Rafael
 St. Francis, Candlestick Park, San Francisco (in the process of being relocated by 2018)

References

External links 
 Ruth Cravath collection at San Francisco Museum of Modern Art (SFMOMA)
 Oral history interview with Ruth Cravath from 1965, Archives of American Art, Smithsonian Institution

1902 births
1986 deaths
San Francisco Art Institute alumni
San Francisco Art Institute faculty
School of the Art Institute of Chicago alumni
Mills College faculty
Artists from San Francisco
Grinnell College alumni